Craugastor vulcani is a species of frog in the family Craugastoridae. It is endemic to the Sierra de los Tuxtlas range in southern Veracruz state, Mexico. Its name refers to its type locality on the San Martin Tuxtla volcano. Common name Volcan San Martin rainfrog has been proposed for it.

Description
Adult males measure  in snout–vent length [although males as small 31 mm SVL had nuptial pads] and adult females  SVL. The tympanum is distinct. The fingers and toes bear well-developed discs. The fingers have lateral keels while the toes have lateral flanges and are moderately webbed. The eyelids have numerous medium-sized, rounded tubercles. Skin of the dorsum is rugose with groups of tubercles and short glandular folds, and typically with well-defined parietal and suprascapular ridges. The dorsal coloration is variable: olive brown, reddish brown, or dark smokey gray, and either uniformly colored or with an irregular middorsal yellow or orange stripe; some individuals are mottled with dark brown. The sides are paler, usually pale yellow-brown or tan suffused with brown. The venter is cream to buff. Males have dark melanophores in their chest and belly while females have immaculate bellies. The iris is bronze.

Habitat and conservation
It occurs along streams. Development is direct (i.e., there is no free-living larval stage).

The species is threatened by habitat loss (deforestation) and its distribution area is small, prompting classification as an endangered species. It occurs in the Los Tuxtlas Biosphere Reserve, but significant deforestation is occurring in this reserve.

References

vulcani
Endemic amphibians of Mexico
Amphibians described in 1955
Taxa named by Frederick A. Shannon
Taxonomy articles created by Polbot
Endemic fauna of Los Tuxtlas